Robert James Mitchell (1912 – 5 January 1998) was a unionist politician in Northern Ireland.

After becoming a captain during World War II, Mitchell worked as a sales representative.  He was elected to Lurgan Borough Council in 1957 for the Ulster Unionist Party, serving until its abolition in 1973.  He was elected in the 1969 Northern Ireland general election in North Armagh, serving from 1971 until 1972 as Secretary of the 1966 Committee of backbenchers.  He was expelled from the Ulster Unionist Parliamentary Party in January 1972 when he voted for a Democratic Unionist Party censure motion opposing a ban on certain processions planned for 12 July.

The Parliament was prorogued in 1972 and abolished the following year.  Mitchell stood in Armagh for the 1973 Assembly, but was not elected.  In 1989, he joined the Conservatives in Northern Ireland, and became Vice-Chairman of the party's East Londonderry association.

References

1912 births
1998 deaths
Conservative Party (UK) politicians
Councillors in County Armagh
Members of the House of Commons of Northern Ireland 1969–1973
Ulster Unionist Party members of the House of Commons of Northern Ireland
Members of the House of Commons of Northern Ireland for County Armagh constituencies
Ulster Unionist Party councillors